Stanley Eugene "Ted" Bishop (January 10, 1913 – September 25, 1986) was an American golfer who had a brief professional career before being reinstated as an amateur in the 1930s.

Early life 
Bishop was born in Natick, Massachusetts.

Career 
Bishop won several amateur tournaments, including three Massachusetts Amateurs and two New England Amateurs, with his biggest win being the 1946 U.S. Amateur. He defeated Smiley Quick on the 37th hole of the 36-hole final match at Baltusrol Golf Club in Springfield, New Jersey.

Bishop played on the winning Walker Cup teams in 1947 and 1949.

Amateur wins
1940 Massachusetts Amateur
1941 New England Amateur
1946 Massachusetts Amateur, New England Amateur, U.S. Amateur
1961 Massachusetts Amateur

U.S. national team appearances
Amateur
Walker Cup: 1947 (winners), 1949 (winners)

References

American male golfers
Golfers from Massachusetts
People from Natick, Massachusetts
Sportspeople from Middlesex County, Massachusetts
1913 births
1986 deaths